The 1st Central Committee of the Lao People's Party (LPP) was elected at the 1st LPP National Congress in 1955. It was originally composed of five members but the number of members increased over the years.

Members

Original

Add-ons

References

1955 establishments in Laos
1st Central Committee of the Lao People's Party